Caner Ağca (born 28 October 1984 in Turkey) is a Turkish professional football player who currently plays for Karşıyaka S.K.

Career

References

1984 births
Living people
Turkish footballers
Footballers from İzmir
Süper Lig players
TFF First League players
Karşıyaka S.K. footballers
Association football midfielders